"The Man and the Hour" is the first ever episode of the British comedy sitcom Dad's Army. It was originally transmitted on 31 July 1968 and was later adapted for radio. It was also the first ever black and white episode. The first ever episode marked the first regular appearances of Arthur Lowe (Captain George Mainwaring), John Le Mesurier (Sergeant Arthur Wilson), Clive Dunn (Lance Corporal Jack Jones), John Laurie (Private James Frazer), Arnold Ridley (Private Charles Godfrey), Ian Lavender (Private Frank Pike) and James Beck (Private Joe Walker).

Synopsis
On the outbreak of the Second World War, a local bank manager, George Mainwaring, takes it upon himself to form a unit of Local Defence Volunteers in the Sussex town of Walmington-on-Sea.

Plot
It starts in present-day (1968) with local Walmington-on-Sea dignitary George Mainwaring announcing that he is backing Britain. A flash back shows on a TV screen showing scenes from the Second World War and the Army.

It then reverts to Swallows Bank (1940), Walmington-on-Sea. George Mainwaring and his clerks, Arthur Wilson and Frank Pike, are laying sandbags at the window. Mainwaring then receives a message saying that he can set up a LDV unit to protect Britain. He finds out more about this on the wireless, having been told by a clerk, Janet King, that Anthony Eden is about to make a Ministerial broadcast. Pike is told to go round to all the LDV volunteers and tell them to meet in the church hall.

At the church hall, many people are waiting and Mainwaring (now the self-appointed commander) begins to enroll them. He makes Wilson his sergeant and Jones his lance-corporal. ARP warden Hodges bursts in and tells the commander to "shove off" because he needs the hall for an ARP lecture. Mainwaring is forced to let Hodges use it and instructs the platoon to meet in the hall later.

Later, Captain Mainwaring and Sergeant Wilson are inspecting the platoon, Godfrey has a gun and Mainwaring believes that he should have it because he is the officer, but Godfrey refuses. The platoon are told about tanks and how to defeat them. The men play at being tanks and how to destroy them. Frank's mother, Mavis, arrives to pick up Frank because it's his bedtime. The uniform (armbands) and weapons (pepper) arrive and are handed out. It is not what the platoon expected. Mainwaring gives a speech and the platoon cheer.

Cast

Arthur Lowe as Captain Mainwaring
John Le Mesurier as Sergeant Wilson
Clive Dunn as Lance Corporal Jones
John Laurie as Private Frazer
James Beck as Private Walker
Arnold Ridley as Private Godfrey
Ian Lavender as Private Pike
Janet Davies as Mrs Pike
Caroline Dowdeswell as Janet King
John Ringham as Bracewell
Bill Pertwee as ARP Warden Hodges
Neville Hughes as Soldier
Jack Wright as Despatch Rider

Notes
The episode, and thus the series, begins with a pre-opening credits scene set in the (then) modern day, with the characters, older, gathered at a meal with Mainwaring announcing that he is backing Britain (it is also subtly hinted but not confirmed, that this may be his retirement party from his role of bank manager), as a television set by the characters shows scenes from the Second World War, leading into the opening credits and the series proper. This is the only episode of the series to have a pre-opening credits scene, and the series never returned to the modern day. 
This was the only Dad's Army episode to feature an audience laughter track during the opening titles.
A scene involving the fire brigade wanting to use the hall for practice was rehearsed but not filmed, as the original script turned out to be seven minutes too long
This episode was originally planned for transmission on 5 June 1968 but was put back for UEFA Euro 1968.
Due to this being a pilot episode introducing the characters and premise, an early version of this episode ran at 35 minutes long, which was too long for the standard assigned half-hour broadcast slot. The series was delayed from its originally planned debut on Wednesday 5 June to try and find a suitable thirty-five-minute slot; but eventually was edited down into standard half-hour length to begin broadcast on 31 July 1968. The deleted scenes mostly introduced the various characters more fully, and an additional altercation between Mainwaring and Hodges, which suggests the feud between the pair has been running for many years prior and with Hodges stating that, after Mainwaring "pompously" turned him down for a loan several years prior, now in a time of war that it is he that will rise to the top of the local hierarchy and that Mainwaring will soon be indebted to him. It is unknown if these extra scenes or the original 35-minute version still exist in the BBC archive.
 First regular appearances of Arthur Lowe as Captain George Mainwaring, John Le Mesurier as Sergeant Arthur Wilson, Clive Dunn as Lance Corporal Jack Jones, John Laurie as Private James Frazer, Arnold Ridley as Private Charles Godfrey, Ian Lavender as Private Frank Pike and James Beck as Private Joe Walker.

References

External links

Dad's Army radio episodes
Dad's Army (series 1) episodes
British television series premieres
1968 British television episodes
Fiction set in 1940
Fiction set in 1968
Anthony Eden